Annifo is a frazione of the comune of Foligno, Umbria, central Italy. It is located at 874 m. According to the Istat census of 2001, it has 244 inhabitants.

References 

Frazioni of the Province of Perugia
Foligno